Carex filifolia is a species of sedge known by the common name threadleaf sedge. It is native to western North America and grows on slopes, eroded areas, gravel, and dry habitats.

Description
Carex filifolia produces clumps of stems which are rounded or triangular, wiry, and angled or curved, reaching up to about 35 centimeters long. The root network is extensive and it forms sod. The leaves are narrow and rolled tightly, appearing quill-like.

The inflorescence is up to 3 centimeters long and has flowers coated with reddish scales. The fruit is covered in a sac called a perigynium which is somewhat hairy. The plant produces some seeds, but mainly reproduces vegetatively.

Distribution and habitat
This sedge is native to much of western North America, from Alaska to California and Manitoba to New Mexico, where it grows in moist and dry habitat.

References

External links
Jepson Manual Treatment - Carex filifolia
USDA Plants Profile
Flora of North America
Carex filifolia - Photo gallery

filifolia
Flora of the Sierra Nevada (United States)
Flora of California
Flora of Alaska
Flora of the Western United States
Flora of Western Canada
Plants described in 1818
Flora without expected TNC conservation status